is a railway station in the city of Iwakura, Aichi Prefecture,  Japan, operated by Meitetsu.

Lines

Station layout
The station has two opposed side platforms connected by a footbridge. The station has automated ticket machines, Manaca automated turnstiles and is unattended.

Platforms

Adjacent stations

|-
!colspan=5|Nagoya Railroad

Station history
Ishibotoke Station was opened on August 6, 1912. The station building was rebuilt in May 1982.

Passenger statistics
In fiscal 2017, the station was used by an average of 3890 passengers daily.

Surrounding area
Ichinomiya Minami High School
Ichinomiya Technical High School

See also
 List of Railway Stations in Japan

References

External links

 Official web page 

Railway stations in Japan opened in 1912
Railway stations in Aichi Prefecture
Stations of Nagoya Railroad
Iwakura, Aichi